Ringworld's Children is a 2004 science fiction novel by American writer Larry Niven, the fourth in the Ringworld series set in the Known Space universe. It describes the continuing adventures of Louis Wu and companions on Ringworld.

Plot summary
The novel's plot is largely concerned with the so-called Fringe War. All the intelligent species of Known Space are interested in the Ringworld. In the novel, they engage in a Cold War of sorts (actually begun in the previous novel, The Ringworld Throne) on the fringe of the Ringworld star system.

References

 

2004 American novels
2004 science fiction novels
American science fiction novels
Known Space stories
Novels by Larry Niven
Tor Books books
Fiction set in the 29th century